Croydon North is a constituency represented in the House of Commons of the UK Parliament since 2012 by Steve Reed of Labour Co-op.  The seat was created in 1918 and split in two in 1955 (taking in neighbouring areas) and re-devised in a wholly different form in 1997.

History
The seat was created from the former Croydon North West and part of the former North East constituencies. In its previous form it existed from 1918 until 1955.

On re-creation at the 1997 general election the MP for the seat became Malcolm Wicks of the Labour Party with the fourth largest Labour majority in Greater London. Wicks was victorious at the next two general elections and died on 29 September 2012, prompting a by-election which was won by Steve Reed of the same party. The 2015 result made the seat the 31st safest of Labour's 232 seats by percentage of majority.

Constituency profile
Croydon North is the most densely populated of Croydon's three seats, regarded as a safe Labour seat with all wards controlled by them at local level, consisting for the most part of rows of modest terraced houses, interspersed with tower blocks, much of it social and ex-social housing and with recreational areas.

Passing through the constituency are London Overground and Southern services to London Victoria and Croydon — the seat is well connected by several stations to rail services. There has been some regeneration since 2000 with new-build developments for affluent commuters.

The seat includes Crystal Palace FC's ground at Selhurst Park and the northeastern end of the seat is near the site of the former Crystal Palace itself.

Boundaries

1918–1950: The County Borough of Croydon wards of North, South Norwood, and Upper Norwood.

1950–1955: Wards of the above borough: Bensham Manor, Norbury, Thornton Heath, Upper Norwood, and West Thornton.

1997–2010: The London Borough of Croydon wards of Bensham Manor, Beulah, Broad Green, Norbury, South Norwood, Thornton Heath, Upper Norwood, West Thornton, and Whitehorse Manor.

2010–present: As above less Beulah and Whitehorse Manor, plus Selhurst.

Members of Parliament

As Croydon North

MPs 1918-1955

MPs since 1997

Election results

Elections in the 2010s

Elections in the 2000s

Elections in the 1990s

Elections in the 1950s

Elections in the 1940s

Elections in the 1930s

Elections in the 1920s

Elections in the 1910s

See also
List of parliamentary constituencies in London

Notes

References

Sources

External links 
Politics Resources (Election results from 1922 onwards)
Electoral Calculus (Election results from 1955 onwards)

Parliamentary constituencies in London
Politics of the London Borough of Croydon
Constituencies of the Parliament of the United Kingdom established in 1918
Constituencies of the Parliament of the United Kingdom disestablished in 1955
Constituencies of the Parliament of the United Kingdom established in 1997